Kristin Venn (born 5 March 1994) is a Norwegian handball player who plays for the Norwegian club Storhamar HE.

She was also a part of Norway's 28-squad for the 2015 World Women's Handball Championship as well as the 28-squad for the 2014 European Women's Handball Championship. She has already participated for Norway's recruit team.

She also represented Norway in 2014 Women's Junior World Handball Championship, placing 9th.

On 4 October 2017, Venn announced that she will not be playing anymore for the national team. She is going to focus on playing for her club Byåsen HE and just enjoy playing handball. She later opened up for the possibility to fight for a spot on the national team, and is currently a part of the extended squad (the recruit team).

Achievements 
Youth European Championship:
Bronze Medalist: 2011
Youth World Championship:
Bronze Medalist: 2012

Achievements
Norwegian League
 Silver: 2020/2021, 2021/2022
Norwegian Cup:
Finalist: 2018, 2019

Individual awards
 All-Star Left Wing of the Youth European Championship: 2011
 All-Star Left Wing of the U18 European Open: 2012
 All-Star Left Wing of Eliteserien: 2018/2019

References

1994 births
Living people
People from Skaun
Norwegian female handball players
Sportspeople from Trøndelag